Munich Harras is a railway and Munich U-Bahn interchange station. It is located in the Harras area of the borough of Sendling. It serves as an important transportation hub for the borough, providing interchange between U-Bahn, S-Bahn, local bus services as well as limited regional railway services on the Bayerische Oberlandbahn main line. The S-Bahn station is located down the road from the U-Bahn station, necessitating a short walk along Albert-Roßhaupter-Straße. Both the U-Bahn station and the S-Bahn station have access for the disabled.

Name 
The station is named after a large road intersection, Am Harras, where Albert-Roßhaupter-Straße (east-west) and Plinganserstraße (north-south) meet. Before the rise of local buses, Am Harras used to be an important tramway interchange station, servicing lines 6 and 8. Evidence of this can still be found, as many of the tramway lanes have been converted to bus lanes. Plinganserstraße, running south from Harras, boasts a large green patch dividing the north-south lanes, where the former tramway used to run.

Nearby places of interest 
 Sendling Church
 Am Harras

References

External links

Railway stations in Germany opened in 1975
Harras
1975 establishments in West Germany
Harras
Harras